Piskent ( or ) is a district of Tashkent Region in Uzbekistan. The capital lies at the city Piskent. The district consists of one city (Piskent), 2 urban-type settlements (Muratali, Said) and 6 rural communities (Oq tepa, Dungqoʻrgʻon, Kelovchi, Murotali, Koriz, Said).

References

Districts of Uzbekistan
Tashkent Region